Shayesteh Irani (born ) is an Iranian film, television and stage actress.

Biography 
Irani was born in 1979 in Tehran, Iran. She attended Islamic Azad University, before becoming a movie actress in 2005. 

She has starred in several films including Season of Narges (2017), Facing Mirrors (2011), Offside (2006),  (2009), and others.

Awards and nominations 

 2006 – Best Actress for Offside at Gijón International Film Festival, Spain
 2011 – nominated for the Best Actress Award for Facing Mirrors by Fajr International Film Festival

References

External links 
 

1979 births
Living people
People from Tehran
Actresses from Tehran
Iranian film actresses
Iranian television actresses
Islamic Azad University alumni